The Old Randfontein mine is a large mine located in the northern part of South Africa in Gauteng. Old Randfontein represents one of the largest uranium reserves in South Africa having estimated reserves of 247.2 million tonnes of ore grading 0.025% uranium.

References 

Uranium mines in South Africa
Economy of Gauteng